Bourke Street Wesleyan Chapel is a heritage-listed chapel at 348a Bourke Street in the inner city Sydney suburb of Darlinghurst in the City of Sydney local government area of New South Wales, Australia. The property is owned by the Wesleyan Church. It was added to the New South Wales State Heritage Register on 2 April 1999. It was also known as the Bourke Street Methodist Church.

History 

The sandstone chapel was built in 1847.

An eight-storey residential building was built behind the original facade and hall in the 1970s, opening as the Edward Eagar Lodge homelessness centre in 1979.

Heritage listing 
The Wesleyan Chapel was listed on the New South Wales State Heritage Register on 2 April 1999.

See also 

Homelessness in Australia

References

Bibliography

Attribution 

New South Wales State Heritage Register
Darlinghurst, New South Wales
Chapels in Australia
Articles incorporating text from the New South Wales State Heritage Register